Bec Korfball Club is based in South London, England and is a member of the England Korfball Association. 

Established in 1948 in Tooting, Bec is the second oldest korfball club in the UK. It currently has five teams that play in various leagues across London and the UK. The Bec Korfball Club first team won the Korfball Europa Shield in 2015 and came second in the same tournament in 2016. It has also been runner up in the England Korfball League three times (2013–14, 2014–15 & 2015–2016).

IKF Europa Shield
The Europa Shield is the second tier annual korfball club competition by the International Korfball Federation. Bec has won this competition 4 times.

References

Korfball teams in England
Korfball teams
Sports clubs in London
Sports clubs established in 1948